Mohammad Khurshid Khan is a British Pakistani academic who previously served as Vice-Chancellor of Abdul Wali Khan University Mardan. He is professor of Manufacturing Systems Engineering and Director for Student Recruitment (School of Engineering) at University of Bradford. He is currently on sabbatical from the University of Bradford and is serving as the CEO of Feversham Education Trust (FET) in Bradford.

Khan received his BEng in 1983, Phd in 1987, and MBA degree in 1997 from the University of Bradford, UK.

References

Living people
Pakistani academic administrators
Vice-Chancellors of the Abdul Wali Khan University Mardan
Alumni of the University of Bradford
People associated with the University of Bradford
Year of birth missing (living people)